Mark Terrill is a well-traveled American poet, translator, and prose writer who has resided in Northern Germany since the mid-1980s.

Biography
Born on July 1, 1953, in Berkeley, California, Mark Terrill grew up in the unincorporated mountain community of Sky Londa in San Mateo County, south of San Francisco. After failing to complete high school, he traveled widely in the Pacific Northwest and Alaska, working as a dishwasher, woodcutter, gardener, bartender, taxi driver, gravedigger, sawmill worker, deckhand, and welder before finally obtaining his seaman’s papers and shipping out of San Francisco to the Far East and beyond. In 1982, he attended the School of Visual Arts Writing Workshop conducted by Paul Bowles in Tangier, Morocco, and after extensive travels throughout Morocco and Europe, finally settled in Hamburg, Germany in 1984. Simultaneously with pursuing his literary activities, he has been employed as a shipyard welder, road manager for various rock bands (American Music Club, Mekons, etc.), cook, and postal worker. He currently lives on the grounds of a former boatyard near Hamburg with his wife, Uta, and several cats.

Writing
Terrill began writing in the early 1970s. His first poems appeared in Vagabond, a small-press magazine published by John Bennett that featured the work of Charles Bukowski, Jack Micheline, D.A. Levy, Al Masarik, and many others. Since then, Terrill’s writings and translations have appeared in over one thousand journals and anthologies worldwide, including City Lights Review, Denver Quarterly, Bombay Gin, Skanky Possum, Zen Monster, Talisman, Partisan Review, Gargoyle, Rattle and others. He has published several full-length collections, chapbooks, and broadsides of his poetry, prose, and translations with numerous small-press publishers in the USA and Europe. A four-time Pushcart Prize nominee, his work has been translated into Portuguese, French, and German. For over ten years, he was a regular contributor to Rain Taxi Review of Books, and in 2009 he was invited to guest-edit a special German Poetry issue of the Atlanta Review, which also featured his own translations of Peter Handke, Günter Grass, Nicolas Born, Rolf Dieter Brinkmann and many others. In addition, his translations of the poetry of Rolf Dieter Brinkmann have been assembled in two full-length book collections, along with appearing elsewhere.

Terrill has read/performed his work in Paris at Shakespeare & Co., The Live Poets Society, Upstairs at Duroc and the American Library; in Berlin at the Poetry Hearings (2006 and 2010) and the International Slam Revue; in Prague at Shakespeare & Sons and The Globe; in Amsterdam at the Sugar Factory, Boekie Woekie and the Fiery Tongues Literary Festival. Together with the poet Cralan Kelder, he co-edits the poetry journal Full Metal Poem, which has published work by Ron Padgett, John Wieners, Joanne Kyger, Cid Corman, Bob Arnold, F.A. Nettelbeck, Louise Landes Levi and others.

Bibliography
Collections of poetry and prose:
 Subliminal Madness (Triton Press, 1978)
 Sorry Try Again (Red Dancefloor Press, 1998)
 Love-Hate Continuum (Green Bean Press, 2001) 
 Kid with Gray Eyes (Cedar Hill Publications, 2001) 
 Bread & Fish (The Figures, 2002) 
 The United Colors of Death (Pathwise Press, 2003)
 Postcard from Mount Sumeru (Bottle of Smoke Press, 2006)
 Sending Off the Godhead in the City of Light (Hydrogen Jukebox Press, 2006)
 17 Poems for the Poetry Hearings (Hydrogen Jukebox Press, 2006)
 Something Red (Plan B Press, 2007)
 Superabundance (Longhouse, 2008)
 The Salvador-Dalai-Lama Express (Main Street Rag, 2009) 
 Laughing Butcher Berlin Blues (Poetry Salzburg, 2010) 
 The Spleen of Madrid, collaborative poems with Francis Poole (Feral Press, 2012)
 A Pair of Darts, collaboration with Francis Poole (Feral Press, 2012)
 Change Remains Suspended (Feral Press, 2013)
 Down at the Gate (Feral Press, 2013)
 The Travelers (Feral Press, 2014)
 Any Number at All (Feral Press, 2016)
 Diamonds & Sapience (Dark Style, 2017)
 Competitive Decadence (New Feral Press, 2017)
 Great Balls of Doubt (Verse Chorus Press, 2020) 
 Disrupting Dystopia (New Feral Press, 2020)
 Reframing Oblivion (New Feral Press, 2021)
 The Undying Guest (Spuyten Duyvil, 2023) 

Broadsides and folios:
 Interzone (Bottle of Smoke Press, 2006)
 Out-the-Window Poems (Bottle of Smoke Press, 2006)
 The Wheel (Kater Murr’s Press, 2010)
 Up All Night (Longhouse, 2011)
 A Poem for Radios (Fact-Simile Editions, 2012)
 The Other Side (Longhouse, 2012)
 Masking Up (Cold Turkey Press, 2022)
 Mirror Ablaze/Dream Thing (Cold Turkey Press, 2022)

Fiction:
 Ultrazone: A Tangier Ghost Story, collaboration with Francis Poole (The Visible Spectrum, 2022) 

Nonfiction:
 Here to Learn: Remembering Paul Bowles (Green Bean Press, 2002) 

Translations:
 Rolf Dieter Brinkmann: Like a Pilot, Selected Poems 1963-1970 (Sulphur River Literary Review Press, 2001) 
 Whispering Villages: Seven German Poets (Longhouse, 2006)
 Nicolas Born: The Bill for Room 11 (Longhouse, 2008)
 Rolf Dieter Brinkmann: Some Very Popular Songs (Toad Press, 2009)
 Rolf Dieter Brinkmann: Under Glass (Longhouse, 2010)
 Jörg Fauser: An Evening in Europe (Toad Press, 2011)
 Rolf Dieter Brinkmann: An Unchanging Blue, Selected Poems 1962-1975 (Parlor Press / Free Verse Editions, 2011) 
 Thomas Brasch: The Murdered Poet (Cold Turkey Press, 2022)
 Thomas Brasch: Kottbusser Tor (Cold Turkey Press, 2022)
 Gregory Corso: The Muse (Moloko Print / Cold Turkey Press, 2022) 
 Lewis Warsh: Ein Platz an der Sonne (Moloko Print 195, 2023) 

Anthology appearances:
 Ends & Beginnings, City Lights Review #6, edited by Lawrence Ferlinghetti (City Lights Books, 1994) 
 Beers, Bars and Breakdowns, edited by Scott Gordon (Staplegun Press, 2000)
 Fake City Syndrome, edited by Kate Gale & Charles Rammelkamp (Red Hen Press, 2002) 
 Nixon Under the Bodhi Tree and Other Works of Buddhist Fiction, edited by Kate Wheeler (Wisdom Publications, 2004) 
 Babylon Burning; 9/11 Five Years On, edited by Todd Swift (nthposition press, 2006)
 Babel Tour (Université Paris Sorbonne-Paris IV, 2008) 
 Last Call: The Bukowski Legacy Continues, edited by RD Armstrong (Lummox Press, 2011) 
 From a Terrace in Prague, edited by Stephan Delbos (Literaria Pragensia, 2011) 
 Haiku 21, edited by Lee Gurga & Scott Metz (Modern Haiku Press, 2011) 
 Bukowski: An Anthology of Poetry & Prose About Charles Bukowski, edited by Melanie Villines (Silver Birch Press, 2013) 
 NOON: An Anthology of Short Poems, edited by Philip Rowland (Isobar Press, 2019) 
 The Best Small Fictions 2020, series editor; Nathan Leslie (Sonder Press, 2020) 

As Editor:
 Atlanta Review: Germany (Vol. XV, No. 2, 2009)
 Full Metal Poem (#1, 2010, together with co-editor Cralan Kelder)

Quotes on Terrill
“Mark Terrill, the true poet and ‘forlorn observer’ of the world he sees as essentially forlorn, if not absurd, if not entirely hopeless, and nothing on the end of his fork to really wax ecstatic about… But his poetry is far from hopeless. It is a hard light to alleviate the situation of the world as he sees it.” - Lawrence Ferlinghetti

“I’ve always liked your poetry; it has a steady, stripped-down rhythm to it. Little pings of microscopic truth.” - John Bennett

References
 Stephanie Baker's review of Bread & Fish in Jacket magazine (#21, February 2003).
 Noah Eli Gordon’s review of The Salvador-Dalai-Lama Express in Rain Taxi Review of Books (Vol. 14, No. 2, Summer 2009).
 Stephan Delbos’ review of The Salvador-Dalai-Lama Express in Alehouse (No. 4, 2010).
 Review of Full Metal Poem in The Prague Post (November 2010).
 Stephan Delbos’ review of Laughing Butcher Berlin Blues in The Prague Post (January 9, 2011).

External links

 Five prose poems in Exquisite Corpse (Cyber issue 11, Spring/Summer 2002).
 Two prose poems in The Brooklyn Rail (April 2004).
 The Stream Video clip. Jay Corsilles’ “motion representation” (2006) of the Mark Terrill prose poem.
 A suite of five prose poems in Stride magazine (2006).
 “A Poem for Patriots” in Diagram (#6.4).
 Two poems in Nth Position (May 2007).
 “A Poem for Uncertainties” in Rattle magazine (#27, Summer 2007).
 “Not About Now But Right After” in Wood Coin magazine (Feb 2009).
 “A Poem for the Here & Now" in Wood Coin (Dec 2009).
 Translations of two Rolf Dieter Brinkmann poems in Jacket magazine (#40, late 2010).
 Seven poems in Turntable & Blue Light (May 2010).
 “A Poem for Uncertainties” Audio clip. Experimental spoken-word track (SoundCloud, 2012).
 Review of Great Balls of Doubt in B O D Y (Winter Issue, 2021).

1953 births
Living people
American male poets
American translators